is a Japanese singer signed to Sacra Music and represented by Creative Office Cue. She released her first single "ideal white" on October 22, 2014, which is used as the opening theme to the 2014 anime television series Fate/stay night: Unlimited Blade Works. Her second single "Vanilla Sky" released on April 29, 2015, which is used as the opening theme to the 2015 anime television series Gunslinger Stratos. "infinity beyond". Ayano's third single was released August 19, 2015, and was used as the theme song for the Gunslinger Stratos Reloaded PC game. Her fourth single, "Lotus Pain", was released on August 3, 2016, and is used as the ending theme for D.Gray-Man Hallow. 

Her first album White Palace released on October 5, 2016. Ayano moved to the Sacra Music record label under Sony Music Entertainment Japan in April 2017. Her fifth single "Newlook" was released on May 17, 2017; the song is used as the ending theme of anime Re:Creators.. Her sixth single "starry" was released on January 17, 2018; the song is used as the first opening theme of anime Record of Grancrest War. Her seventh single  was released digitally on May 12, 2018, and received physical release on May 16, 2018; the song is used as the second ending theme of anime Record of Grancrest War. 

Her eighth single "Get Over/confession/ Glamorous Sky" was released on July 17, 2019. The song "Get Over" was released digitally on July 1, 2019, and it was used as the fourth ending song of anime Puzzle & Dragons Her second album Arch Angel was released on September 2, 2019 Her ninth single "Alive" was released on January 11, 2020, and received physical release on February 19, 2020; the song is used as the ending theme of anime Darwin's Game. On September 22, 2021 she released her first digital compilation album white chronicles.

On December 14, 2021 it was announced that she will leave her agency "Creative Office Cue" and label Sacra Music at the end of the year, after her contract expired.

Discography

Studio albums

Compilation albums

Mini-albums

Singles

Digital singles

References

External links
 

Living people
Sony Music Entertainment Japan artists
Japanese women pop singers
Musicians from Hokkaido
Sacra Music artists
Anime musicians
Year of birth missing (living people)